The Count of Luxembourg is an operetta. It may also refer to:

 The Count of Luxemburg (1957 film), a German film
 The Count of Luxemburg (1972 film), a German film